TMP can refer to any of the following:

Chemistry
 2,2,6,6-Tetramethylpiperidine, an organic chemistry reagent
 Thymidine monophosphate, a nucleotide
 Trimethoprim, an antibiotic
 Trimethyl phosphate, a solvent
 Trimethylolpropane, a precursor to polymers

Information and communications technology
 Tab Mix Plus, a Mozilla Firefox extension
 Template metaprogramming
 .tmp, a temporary folder in Unix or Linux systems

Media
 Te Māngai Pāho, the Māori Broadcast Funding Agency
 Tickle Me Pink, a band from Fort Collins, Colorado
 Tiny Moving Parts, a Minnesota-based emo band
 Tsukuyomi -Moon Phase-, an anime series
 An abbreviation for Star Trek: The Motion Picture

Business
 TMP Worldwide Advertising and Communications
 Todd McFarlane Productions
 Trans Mountain pipeline

Politics
Tipra Motha Party
The Tipra Motha Party (TMP), also known as the Tipraha Indigenous Progressive Regional Alliance, is a regional political party.

Transport
 Toyota Motor Philippines

Devices
 Steyr TMP, a machine pistol made by Steyr Mannlicher
 Turbomolecular pump, a high vacuum pump

Other
 East Timor, ISO 3166-1 3-letter country code and an abbreviation
 The Meeting Place (church), a church in Winnipeg, Manitoba, Canada
 Tampere-Pirkkala Airport
 Time–manner–place, a linguistic term
 Thomas More Prep-Marian, a private high school in Hays, Kansas
 Theban Mapping Project
 Thermo mechanical pulp
 Transmembrane pressure, the pressure difference between feed and permeate stream in Ultrafiltration
 Royal Tyrrell Museum of Palaeontology
Transverse Mercator projection, a map projection and a system for specifying geodetic coordinates based on this projection